Primevil was a short-lived American rock group in the 1970s. Their only release, Smokin' Bats at Campton's, has been described as "a bona fide stoner rock touchstone" and was later reissued in 2006. In 2007, the group was mentioned in an article in Classic Rock magazine titled "The Lost Pioneers of Heavy Metal".

Discography
Smokin' Bats at Campton's (1974)

Tracks:
01. Leavin' (Larry Lucas, Mark Sipe, Dave Campton) - 3:53
02. Progress (Mark Sipe, Dave Campton) - 3:25
03. Fantasies (Jay Wilfong) - 6:04
04. Pretty Woman (Mel Cupp, Larry Lucas, Mark Sipe, Dave Campton) - 3:12
05. Tell Me If You Can (Dave Campton, Mel Cupp, Larry Lucas, Mark Sipe, Jay Wilfong) - 5:04
06. Hey, Lover (Primevil) - 2:38
07. High Steppin' Stomper (Dave Campton, Mark Sipe, Jay Wilfong) - 4:27
08. Your Blues (Dave Campton, Mark Sipe, Jay Wilfong) - 7:26

Personnel:
- Dave Campton - lead vocals, harp, percussion
- Larry Lucas - electric & acoustic guitar, vocals
- Jay Wilfong - electric guitar, screams
- Mark Sipe - bass
- Mel Cupp - drums

References

American hard rock musical groups
American psychedelic rock music groups
Rock music groups from Indiana